Keevin Allicock (born 9 June 1999) is a Guyanese boxer. He competed in the men's featherweight event at the 2020 Summer Olympics.

References

External links
 

1999 births
Living people
Guyanese male boxers
Olympic boxers of Guyana
Boxers at the 2020 Summer Olympics
Pan American Games competitors for Guyana
Boxers at the 2019 Pan American Games
Sportspeople from Georgetown, Guyana